The bonefish (Albula vulpes) is the type species of the bonefish family (Albulidae), the only family in order Albuliformes.

Taxonomy
Bonefish were once believed to be a single species with a global distribution, however 9 different species have since been identified. There are three identified species in the Atlantic and six in the Pacific. Albula vulpes is the largest and most widespread of the Atlantic species.

Distribution 
This species inhabits warm subtropical and tropical waters of the western Atlantic, and is found off the coasts of southern Florida, the Gulf of Mexico, and the West Indies.

Description

The color of bonefish can range from very silver sides and slight darker backs to olive green backs that blend to the silver side. Slight shading on the scales often leads to very soft subtle lines that run the flank of the fish from the gills to the tail. The bases of the pectoral fins are sometimes yellow.
Bonefish can live up to 20 years and reach sexual maturity at 2–3 years of age (when they're over 17 inches (43.18 cm) long). Larvae drift for an average of 53 days. Juveniles often live over open sandy bottoms.

Behavior
An amphidromous species, it lives in inshore tropical waters and moves onto shallow mudflats or sand flats to feed with the incoming tide. Adults and juveniles may shoal together, and mature adults may be found singly or in pairs.

The bonefish feeds on benthic worms, fry, crustaceans, and mollusks. Ledges, drop-offs, and clean, healthy seagrass beds yield abundant small prey such as crabs and shrimp. It may follow stingrays to catch the small animals they root from the substrate.

In the Los Roques archipelago bonefish primarily hunt glass minnows, however this behavior is atypical.

Fishing and cuisine
Bonefish are considered one of the premier fly and light tackle game fish. Fishing for bonefish, called bonefishing, is a popular sport in the Bahamas, Puerto Rico, southern Florida, Cargados Carajos. Since bonefish live in shallow inshore water, fishing may be done by wading or from a shallow-draft boat. Bonefishing is mostly done for the sport, so the fish are released, but they may also be eaten in less developed areas. A typical Bahamian recipe is a split fish seasoned with pepper sauce and salt, then baked.

Bonefish are notoriously wary and great skill must be taken both in approach and presentation when fishing for them. English speaking fishermen often refer to them as “grey ghosts."

See also
 Atlantic tarpon
 Ladyfish
 Milkfish

References

External links
 Adams, A., et al. 2012. Albula vulpes. In: IUCN 2012. IUCN Red List of Threatened Species. Version 2012.2. Downloaded on 2 June 2013.
 Chico Fernandez, Fly-fishing for Bonefish, 2004, .
 Bonefish and Tarpon Conservation Research 
 Hawaiian Bonefish Tagging Program
 

Albuliformes
Fish of the Caribbean
Fish described in 1758
Taxa named by Carl Linnaeus